Arte or ARTE can refer to:
 Art in Italian
 Arte - public Franco-German TV network
 ARTE (Thermal Exchange) - project intended to create “Thermal Exchange”, an experiment for the International Space Station
 Arte River - river in Australia
 Nokia 8800 Arte - a luxury mobile phone
 Arte Johnson (1929–2019) - American comic actor
 Arte (manga) - Japanese manga series